The 2015 Salt Lake City mayoral election took place on November 3, 2015, to elect the Mayor of Salt Lake City, Utah. The election was held concurrently with various other local elections, and was officially nonpartisan.

Incumbent Mayor Ralph Becker, a Democrat in office since 2008, sought a third term in office, but was narrowly defeated by Jackie Biskupski.

A primary election was held on August 11 to determine the two candidates that moved on to the November general election.

Candidates

Declared
 Ralph Becker, incumbent Mayor
 Jackie Biskupski, former State Representative
 George Chapman, community activist
 Luke Garrott, City Councilman
 Dave Robinson, businessman

Withdrawn
 Jim Dabakis, State Senator and former Chairman of the Utah Democratic Party

Declined
 Rocky Anderson, former Mayor and Justice Party nominee for President of the United States in 2012
 Kyle LaMalfa, City Councilman
 Charlie Luke, City Councilman
 Stan Penfold, City Councilman
 Jill Remington Love, Director of the Salt Lake City Community and Economic Development Department and former City Councilwoman

Primary election

Polling

Endorsements

Results

General election

Results

References

2015 Utah elections
2015 United States mayoral elections
2015